"Satisfaction" is a song by American pop singer Laura Branigan, which was released as the fourth and final single from her 1984 album Self Control. The song's original music was written by Bernd Dietrich, Gerd Grabowski and Engelbert Simons, whilst the English lyrics were written by Mark Spiro and superstar songwriter Diane Warren. It was produced by Jack White and Robbie Buchanan, who both produced the entire Self Control album together.

Background
As a track on Branigan's biggest-selling album Self Control, the song was released purposely for the dance club scene and was not given a full release in America. It peaked at #24 on the Billboard Dance Music/Club Play Singles.

In 1985, Finnish singer Eini Orajärvi covered the song under the title "Tyydytys", released as a Finnish single from her album Eini.

Release
In America, the single was released on promotional 12" vinyl only, although it was also given a full 12" vinyl release. The single was also released in Germany and France, where it was issued on 7" and 12" vinyl (7" vinyl only in France). All versions of the single were issued by Atlantic Records.

The main American 12" vinyl featured an extended version of the song as the main track, dubbed "Satisfaction (Vocal/Extended Version)". The B-side was the album version of "Ti Amo", taken from the Self Control album and written by Giancarlo Bigazzi, Umberto Tozzi and Warren. The American 12" promo release featured the "Extended Version" again as the A-side but with the album version of "Satisfaction" as the B-side. In Germany and France, the 7" vinyl featured the album version of the song as the main track, along with the song "If You Loved Me" as the B-side. This song, written by Warren and The Doctor (Steven Angelica), was taken from Branigan's 1982 debut album, Branigan. The German 12" vinyl featured the extended version re-titled "Special Dance Mix" as the main track and "If You Loved Me" as the B-side. The extended version of the song was included as one of four bonus tracks on the 2013 Gold Legion remastered and expanded edition of the Self Control album, where it used the title "Special Dance Mix".

All versions of the single came in a generic Atlantic Records sleeve, except for the German and French 7" vinyl and the German 12" vinyl. These three issues featured a full-colour picture sleeve featuring a close-up photograph of Branigan. The back cover highlighted and promoted Branigan's three albums; Branigan, Branigan 2 and Self Control.

Following the song's release on the Self Control album and as a single, the song was also the B-side to the "Ti Amo" single. The song has also appeared on the 2006 Laura Branigan compilation The Platinum Collection. Additionally, it appeared on the 1985 German WEA various artists compilation Hot and New '85, as well as the 2009 various artists compilation Pop & Rock Klub 80, Vol. 2, released by 4Ever Music/Warner Music.

Promotion
Although no music video was created for the single, Branigan performed the song on American Bandstand on June 9, 1984, along with "Self Control". On January 9, 1985, she would perform the song live on The Tonight Show, along with "Ti Amo".

In Germany, Branigan mimed the song on the German TV Show  during her tour in Europe. She also appeared on Thommy's Pop Show Extra 1984 in Germany on December 18, 1984, where she performed "Self Control," "The Lucky One," and "Satisfaction".

The song was performed live during Branigan's 1984 tour. Additionally, the song was professionally recorded and released as a song on Branigan's first video release, Laura Branigan in 1984. The video, including the song, was filmed live at Caesars Tahoe and was broadcast on television as Laura Branigan in Concert.

On March 12, 1984, Branigan appeared in an episode of the American science-fiction superhero television series Automan. The episode, titled "Murder MTV," saw Branigan perform a selection of tracks, including "Satisfaction."

Track listing
7" Single
"Satisfaction" - 3:40
"If You Loved Me" - 3:15

12" Single (American release)
"Satisfaction (Vocal/Extended Version)" - 5:56
"Ti Amo (Vocal/LP Version)" - 4:18

12" Single (American promo)
"Satisfaction (Vocal/Extended Version)" - 5:56
"Satisfaction (Vocal/LP Version)" - 3:56

12" Single (German release)
"Satisfaction (Special Dance Mix)" - 5:56
"If You Loved Me" - 3:15

Chart performance

Personnel 
 Producers on "Satisfaction" - Jack White, Robbie Buchanan
 Executive Producer on "Satisfaction" - Jack White
 Producers on "If You Loved Me" - Jack White, Robbie Buchanan
 Producers on "Ti Amo" - Jack White, Robbie Buchanan
 Executive Producer on "Ti Amo" - Jack White
 Arranger on "Satisfaction" - Harold Faltermeyer
 Arranger on "Ti Amo" - Robbie Buchanan
 Writers of "Satisfaction" (Original Music) – Bernd Dietrich, Gerd Grabowski, Engelbert Simons
 Writers of "Satisfaction" (English Lyrics) – Mark Spiro, Diane Warren
 Writers of "If You Loved Me" - Diane Warren, The Doctor
 Writers of "Ti Amo" (Original Music) - Giancarlo Bigazzi, Umberto Tozzi
 Writers of "Ti Amo" (English Lyrics) - Diane Warren

References

Laura Branigan songs
1984 singles
1984 songs
Atlantic Records singles
Songs written by Diane Warren